Rani Vijaya Devi of Kotda-Sangani (28 August 1922 - 8 December 2005), born Maharajakumari Vijayalakshmi Ammanni, was the eldest daughter of  Yuvaraja Kanteerava Narasimha Raja Wadiyar and sister of Maharaja Jaya Chamaraja Wadiyar.

She grew up in Chamundi Vihar, the palace of her father. She learnt piano from the nuns of Good Shepherd convent and later from Alfred Mistowsky of the Trinity College, London who was visiting Mysore. She was also taught to play veena from Veena Venkatagiriyappa. In 1939, on a tour of Europe with her father, she met Sergei Rachmaninoff.   

She married the prince of Kotda-Sangani in 1941. She moved to New York in 1947 with her husband, who had joined Indian Foreign Service. She studied at the Juilliard School of Music under Eduard Steuermann. 

She founded the International Music and Arts Society in Bangalore. The past patrons of the society have included the Governors of Karnataka, Smt. Rukmini Devi Arundale, S. M. Krishna and Sri. Srikantadatta Narasimharaja Wadiyar.

She had four daughters: Gita Devi Nath, Usha Devi Malavi, Urmila Devi and Shakuntala Devi, and five grand-children: Akshay Malavi, Priyam Malavi, Udaya Nath, Hanumant Nath and Anishaa Taraporvala.

She died on 8 December 2005 in Bangalore.

References

External links
 A musical Tribute to Rani Vijaya Devi
 Musical Queen

1922 births
2005 deaths
Indian women classical singers
Indian princesses
Musicians from Mysore
Wadiyar dynasty
Dancers from Karnataka
Women Carnatic singers
Carnatic singers
20th-century Indian dancers
20th-century Indian musicians
20th-century Indian women artists
Women musicians from Karnataka
Women of the Kingdom of Mysore
People of the Kingdom of Mysore
Veena players
20th-century Indian women singers
20th-century Indian singers